Stephan Hoffmann (9 August 1950 – ?) was a professional German footballer.

Hoffmann made 17 appearances in the Bundesliga and one appearance in the 2. Bundesliga for Tennis Borussia Berlin during his playing career.

References

External links 
 

1950 births
German footballers
Association football defenders
Bundesliga players
2. Bundesliga players
Tennis Borussia Berlin players
Living people